Throsby is a surname, and may refer to:

Charles Throsby (1777–1828), Australian explorer and parliamentarian after whom the electoral division and the suburb are named
David Throsby (born 1939), Australian economist, sister of Margaret Throsby, uncle of Holly Throsby
Elizabeth Throsby, Australian survivor of the 1809 Boyd massacre. 
Holly Throsby (born 1978), Australian songwriter, musician, singer, niece of David Throsby, daughter of Margaret Throsby
John Throsby (1740–1803), English antiquary
Margaret Throsby (born 1941), Australian radio broadcaster, sister of David Throsby, mother of Holly Throsby